Naxos and Lesser Cyclades is a municipality in the Naxos regional unit, South Aegean region, Greece. The seat of the municipality is the town Naxos (city). The municipality consists of the Cycladic island of Naxos and the islands of the Lesser Cyclades: Donousa, Irakleia, Koufonisia, Schoinoussa and several smaller islands. The municipality has an area of 495.867 km2.

Municipality
The municipality Naxos and Lesser Cyclades was formed at the 2011 local government reform by the merger of the following 6 former municipalities, that became municipal units:
Donousa
Drymalia
Irakleia
Koufonisia
Naxos (city)
Schoinoussa

References

Municipalities of the South Aegean
Cyclades
Populated places in Naxos (regional unit)